Love, At First… is a 2015 Chinese romantic comedy film directed by Tao Hai. The film was released on August 7, 2015.

Cast
Juck Zhang
Xiaofeng Li
David Wu
Yao Zhang
Jingjing Qu
Yase Liu
Thomas Price
Mike Sui
Cecilia Yip

Reception
The film earned  at the Chinese box office.

References

External links

2015 romantic comedy films
Chinese romantic comedy films